Abergavenny railway station is situated south-east of the town centre of Abergavenny, Wales. It is part of the British railway system owned by Network Rail and is operated by Transport for Wales. It lies on the Welsh Marches Line between Newport and Hereford.

Abergavenny lies at the eastern edge of the Brecon Beacons National Park and provides an access point to local services and public transport into the park. The station is Grade II listed and was designed by Charles Liddell, in an Italianate architectural style when he was Chief Engineer of the Newport, Abergavenny and Hereford Railway.

History
The station, designed by Charles Liddell, Chief Engineer of the Newport, Abergavenny and Hereford Railway (NA&HR), is in an Italianate architecture style in a local pink semi-ashlar sandstone with natural slate roofs and stone stacks. The down platform building is stone with a timber-framed front and a natural slate roof. The footbridge comprises cast iron columns of typical GWR design which support the stairways and the two spans. The span over the now removed by-pass freight lines is the wrought iron lattice girder original but the main span over the running tracks was replaced by a steel plate-girder in the late 20th century. 

The NA&HR amalgamated with other railways in 1860 to form the West Midland Railway, which itself amalgamated with the Great Western Railway in 1863. The line then passed on to the Western Region of British Railways on nationalisation in 1948. In 1950, the station was renamed Abergavenny Monmouth Road, but reverted to its simple name in 1968. When sectorisation was introduced, the station was served by Regional Railways until the privatisation of British Railways.

Stationmasters
In 1913 the body of station master Thomas Jones was found in the River Usk at Llanellan. He was said to have been suffering from depression but his state of mind was not confirmed as the cause of death at the inquest.

Frederick Corran Barrett 1864 - 1874   (formerly station master at Ledbury, afterwards station master at Bridgnorth)
Joshua John Baugh 1874 - 1884
Fred Angle 1884 - 1896 (afterwards station master at Totnes)
Ernest C. Peglar until 1900 (afterwards station master at Ross)
Thomas Jones 1900 -1913 (formerly station master at Hereford Barton)
Sidney Earle Loveridge 1921 - 1924 (formerly station master at Great Malvern, afterwards station master at Cheltenham)
George Edwin Howell 1928 - 1936 (afterwards station master at Stroud)
James Edward Perkin 1937 - 1939 (formerly station master at Kington)
John Lanman 1946 - 1951 (formerly station master at Blaina, afterwards station master at Merthyr)

Railway town
A branch line to Brynmawr was opened in 1862 starting at Abergavenny Junction station north of the current station, constructed by the Merthyr, Tredegar and Abergavenny Railway (MT&AR). The line also had a station in the town called Abergavenny Brecon Road, making three stations in all. This company was acquired by the London and North Western Railway in 1866. In 1958 the MT&AR passenger trains ceased and Abergavenny Junction was closed.

GWR Locomotive 'Abergavenny Castle'
A GWR Castle-class locomotive, number 5013, was named after Abergavenny Castle.

Facilities
The station is staffed in the daytime, with the ticket office open seven days per week. It has disabled access to platforms, a cafeteria and toilets, plus large waiting rooms on both platforms. Train running information is provided via automated announcements, digital CIS displays and timetable posters, along with a customer help point on platform 1. Step-free access is available on the northbound platform at all times, but to the southbound one only when the ticket office is staffed (as this requires the use of a barrow crossing with locked gates). There is also a footbridge linking the two platforms.

The footbridge was temporarily replaced whilst Network Rail took down and restored the original footbridge between December 2018 and July 2019. The bridge was restored at a specialist company in Cardiff. Works involved adding anti-slip material to the deck and refurbishing the trestle support columns and staircases. Future works include providing the station with step-free access throughout as part of the Department of Transport Access for All fund, which will be match-funded by Transport for Wales.

Services
With a few exceptions, the weekday daytime service pattern typically sees one train per hour in each direction between Manchester Piccadilly and Cardiff Central, with most trains continuing beyond Cardiff to Swansea and West Wales. There is also a two-hourly service between Cardiff and the North Wales Coast Line to  via . These services are all operated by Transport for Wales.
The northbound Premier service from Cardiff to Holyhead calls here on Monday to Fridays but the southbound service does not call here.

Two trains per day in the early morning on weekdays to London Paddington, via Hereford and the Cotswold Line, commenced operation in December 2007. However, they were short lived, being withdrawn in December 2008; they were deemed pointless as changing at Newport was quicker. These services were operated by First Great Western.

References

External links

Former Great Western Railway stations
Railway stations in Monmouthshire
Railway stations in Great Britain opened in 1854
Railway stations served by Transport for Wales Rail
Abergavenny
Italianate architecture in Wales
Grade II listed buildings in Monmouthshire
Grade II listed railway stations in Wales
1854 establishments in Wales
Charles Liddell railway stations
DfT Category D stations